Aldergrove is a hamlet and townland sub-division in County Antrim, Northern Ireland. It is part of the Borough of Antrim and Newtownabbey.

The name Aldergrove is more commonly used to describe the major airfield to the north east of the hamlet. Two long runways serve both the civil Belfast International Airport and the Joint Helicopter Command Flying Station (formerly the military base RAF Aldergrove).

The first jet aircraft to make a non-stop transatlantic flight flew from Aldergrove on 21 February 1951: An RAF English Electric Canberra B Mk 2 (serial number WD932) flown by Squadron Leader A Callard of the A&AEE flew to Gander, Newfoundland, Canada. The flight covered almost 1,800 nautical miles (3,300 km) in four hours and 37 minutes. The aircraft was being flown to the United States to act as a pattern aircraft for the Martin B-57 Canberra.

Aldergrove railway station opened on 13 November 1871, and closed in September 1960.

Climate

See also 
List of villages in Northern Ireland
List of places in County Antrim

References

Villages in County Antrim